The 1963 Copa del Generalísimo Final was the 61st final of the Copa del Rey. The final was played at Camp Nou in Barcelona, on 24 June 1963, being won by FC Barcelona, who beat Real Zaragoza CD 3–1.

Details

References

1963
Copa
FC Barcelona matches
Real Zaragoza matches